Fu Baorong (born June 3, 1978 in Jilin City, Jilin) is a Chinese field hockey player who competed at the 2004 Summer Olympics.  She finished fourth with the Chinese team in the women's competition. She played all six matches and scored three goals.

She competed for the Chinese team at the 2008 Olympic Games, where the team won the silver medal, and at the 2012 Summer Olympics.

External links
 
Profile at Yahoo! Sports

1978 births
Living people
Chinese female field hockey players
Asian Games medalists in field hockey
Asian Games gold medalists for China
Asian Games bronze medalists for China
Field hockey players at the 1998 Asian Games
Field hockey players at the 2002 Asian Games
Field hockey players at the 2004 Summer Olympics
Field hockey players at the 2006 Asian Games
Field hockey players at the 2008 Summer Olympics
Field hockey players at the 2010 Asian Games
Field hockey players at the 2012 Summer Olympics
Medalists at the 1998 Asian Games
Medalists at the 2002 Asian Games
Medalists at the 2006 Asian Games
Medalists at the 2008 Summer Olympics
Medalists at the 2010 Asian Games
Olympic field hockey players of China
Olympic medalists in field hockey
Olympic silver medalists for China
Sportspeople from Jilin City
21st-century Chinese women